The Kossuth Lajos Lutheran Grammar School and Pedagogical Secondary School is in Miskolc, Hungary. The school was established in 1928.

About the school 

The Kossuth Lajos Lutheran Grammar School and Pedagogical Secondary School is in the central of Miskolc, in north-east Hungary. The school has been a Lutheran school since 2001. There are four classes, and 730 students learn in the school. Young people can learn pedagogical studies after final examination. In the grammar school people can learn in English, German, literature, math, biology or original class.

Students can find many free-time activities. E.g.: soccer, volleyball, basketball, aerobics, drama class, trips in the Bükk National Park, summer camps.

History 

In 1920 the Lutheran Church decided that the region needed a pedagogical school. They established the Lutheran Teacher-training College in 1928. Many teacher had completed that school during 1948. Then the Lutheran Teacher-training College became State Training-school for Nursery-school teachers and Grammar School. In 2001 the Lutheran Church got back the establishment.

Courses 

 Advanced English: 
 Advanced German:
 Advanced Biology:
 Hungarian Literature and Grammar:
 Mathematics:

Schools in Hungary
Secondary schools in Hungary